The TI-80 is a graphing calculator designed by Texas Instruments in 1995 to be used at a middle school level (grades 6-8).

The TI-80 featured a 48 x 64 dot-matrix display with a 5 x 3 pixel font, the smallest screen of any TI graphing calculator. It had the slowest processor (980 kHz) of any TI graphing calculator. The first revision of the TI-80 'A' contained a proprietary Toshiba T6M53 ASIC while subsequent revisions contained a Toshiba T6M53A. Additionally, the TI-80 had the processor on board the ASIC, unlike later calculators like the TI-83, TI-83 Plus, and TI-84 Plus which had separate ASIC and processor chips in certain models. In comparison, the TI-81, released in 1990, featured a 2 MHz Zilog Z80 processor.  However, the TI-80 did feature 7 KB of RAM (compared with the TI-81's 2.4 KB).  The TI-80 also had more built-in functions than the TI-81 (such as list and table functions, as well as fraction and decimal conversions).  Like the TI-81, the TI-80 did not feature a link port on the base model, however, unlike the TI-81, the ViewScreen variant (meant for use with TI's overhead projection units) did. The TI-80 was the only graphing calculator to use 2 CR2032 lithium batteries (instead of the standard 4 AAA batteries with a lithium backup battery).

Since its release, it has been superseded by the superior TI-73 and TI-73 Explorer.  The TI-80 was officially discontinued in 1998, when it was replaced by the TI-73, however, production continued until at least October 2000.

See also
 Comparison of Texas Instruments graphing calculators

External links
 DataMath - DataMath Calculator Museum on the TI-80

Graphing calculators
Texas Instruments programmable calculators
Products introduced in 1995